The Fantastic Four Compendium is a Superhero role-playing game supplement published by TSR in 1987 for the Marvel Super Heroes role-playing game.

Contents
The Fantastic Four Compendium is a supplement describing the Fantastic Four, their friends, foes, locations, and vehicles, including details of the Baxter Building, the Skrull, the Inhumans, and Galactus.

Publication history
MA4 The Fantastic Four Compendium was written by David E. Martin, and was published by TSR, Inc., in 1987 as a 96-page book.

Reception

Reviews

References

Marvel Comics role-playing game supplements
Role-playing game supplements introduced in 1987